Koyilandy railway station also known as Quilandy railway station (code: QLD) is a railway station in Kozhikode District, Kerala and falls under the Palakkad railway division of the Southern Railway zone, Indian Railways. The station has three platforms, six tracks and four ticket counters including one special counter for differently-abled citizens. The first station platform has resting areas and a passenger waiting room in the new building.

Facilities 

 Reservation counters are open between 6:00 am to 8:00 pm
 IRCTC shops
 State Bank of India ATM center
 Parking Space

 Autorikshaw stand

See also
 List of railway stations in Kerala
 Kozhikode railway station

Gallery

References

Railway stations in Kozhikode district
Palakkad railway division
Koyilandy area